Lygre is a surname. Notable people with the surname include:

Arne Lygre (born 1968), Norwegian novelist and playwright
Aslaug Låstad Lygre (1910–1966), Norwegian poet